Epermenia commonella is a moth in the family Epermeniidae. It was described by Reinhard Gaedike in 1968. It is found in Australia, where it has been recorded from Queensland.

References

Epermeniidae
Moths described in 1968
Moths of Australia